The Kraków Dance Theatre (Krakowski Teatr Tańca) is a dance theatre that evolved in 2008 from the GRUPAboso Dance Theatre (founded in 1996) and works under the artistic direction of Eryk Makohon in Kraków, Poland.

In 2008 the Krakowski Teatr Tańca GRUPAboso Association was established, whose aim is to support the artistic and educational activities of the Theatre. In 2010 the METAphysical Laboratory was established as the source of new dancers. The students-dancers of the Laboratory have become the guest dancers of the Theatre and they have an opportunity to create their own choreographies with a professional support. 

Some of the company's awards were won at: the Tychy Theatre Meetings (2007, 2009), the Polish Contemporary Dance Confrontation in Konin (2009), the Polish edition of the Solo & Duo Dance Festival (2009 and 2010). Additionally, the company represented Poland at the 13th Biennial of Young Artists from Europe and the Mediterranean, which took place in May 2008 in Bari (Italy).

Performances

As the GRUPAboso Dance Theatre
 1996 10 Years of Fantasy
 1997 Hormones
 1998 Czajap
 1999 The Absurd Azimuth
 1999 I am a Human Being
 1999 Golden Calf
 2000 Tango
 2001 Panaceum
 2001 Rowan, rowan
 2002 Columbus
 2002 Confessions controlled
 2002 0-700 ...
 2003 A conventional portrait
 2003 Metaphysical Duets
 2004 I am a Human Being
 2005 The Coroner
 2006 The Woman in the Dunes
 2006 Cicindela
 2007 Existences

As the Kraków Dance Theatre
 2008 A Ballad of the Silence
 2009 The Seventh Wife of the Eighth
 2010 Do you feel like coffee? (choreographed by Agata Syrek)
 2010 ... and I take you... until (choreographed by Paweł Łyskawa, Agata Syrek)
 2010 Hungers (choreographed by Paweł Łyskawa)
 2010 The Smoke
 2010 Anacoluthon
 2010 TAKARAZUKA camp
 2012 Quadriga for THREE
 2012 Blonde. A try.

See also
Dance in Poland

References

External links
 Official website

Dance in Poland
Arts organizations established in 2008
Dance